Penetrant may refer to:

Penetrant (biochemical), a chemical that increases the ability of a poison to apply its toxic effect to a living organism
 Penetrant (mechanical, electrical, or structural), service of structural item penetrating a fire-resistance rated wall or floor assembly
 Penetrating oil, lubricant

See also 
 Liquid penetrant, medium for Dye penetrant inspection
 Penetrance, in genetics, is the proportion of individuals carrying a particular variant of a gene